Wronów  is a village in the administrative district of Gmina Niechlów, within Góra County, Lower Silesian Voivodeship, in south-western Poland.

The village has a population of 393.

The name of the village is of Polish origin and comes from the word wrona, which means "crow".

References

Villages in Góra County